The Brothers & the Sisters (Ha'Achim Veha'Achayot) is a group of four Israeli singers, two men and two women, that was active between 1971 and 1983, and made a comeback in 2003. The group sang mostly pop-folk songs composed by Gideon Koren, their manager.

Over the years, some of the group's singers were changed. The most famous singer in the group was Susie Miller, who also played and sang during English language lessons on Israeli television.

They were chosen to represent Israel in the Eurovision Song Contest 1980, but as Israel withdrew a little bit before competition, they did not participate.

Discography
 "Live at Tzavta - Im Zer Kotzim" - live concert DVD, NMC  2009
 "Zalman Has a Pair of Pants", Hed Artzi, 2009
 "The Best of the Brothers and the Sisters"—double CD, NMC  2008
 "Best Children's Songs", NMC 2006
 Love for Two (Ahavah shel shnei anashim), Skyton/Visart, 2005
 "Journey to Noteland" (with Shlomo Artzi), Visart, 2004
 "Children's Songs: Berale Tze Hachutza - Ha'Achim Veha'Achayot  1996
 "Beatles: Stories and Melodies to the Beatles Songs - Ha'Achim Veha'Achayot"  1996
 "Top Hits: Ha'Achim Veha'Achayot"  1994

תקליטים Record Albums:

תקליט "האחים והאחיות 1973-1974" - הד ארצי 1974

1975 CBS - תקליט "חופים - שירי נתן יונתן"
  
תקליט "אהבה של שני אנשים" - ישראדיסק 1977

תקליט "בכל מקום - שירי משוררים" - התקליט חיפה 1980

תקליט "במרחק שתי תקוות - שירי יהודה עמיחי" - הד ארצי 1982

תקליט "שירים עד כאן - עשר שנים" - התקליט חיפה 1982

תקליט "על ענפי שיטה - שירים שנשארים" - הד ארצי 1982

תקליטורים CDs:

תקליטור "אהבה של שני אנשים" - ויזארט 2005

תקליטור "האחים והאחיות- המבחר" - התקליט חיפה 1994

תקליטור "לחיות בתוך השיר" - התקליט חיפה 2005

תקליטור "אם זר קוצים" - סדרת "המיטב", NMC 2008

DVD:

תקליטור "אם זר קוצים" - הופעה חיה בצוותא - NMC 2009

שירי ילדים Children's Music:

תקליטים Record Albums:

תקליט "הספינה המזמרת" - התקליט חיפה 1974

תקליט "הטיול לארץ התוים" - ישראדיסק 1975

תקליט "היפיפיה והיחפן" - התקליט חיפה 1974

תקליט "ידידי מכיתה אלף" - התקליט חיפה 1976

תקליט "ספינת המנגינות האבודות" - התקליט 1976

תקליט "דמבו הפילון המעופף" - התקליט 1975

תקליט "החיפושיות" - התקליט חיפה 1977

תקליט "מיטב שירי הילדים" - סיביאס 1977

תקליט "חתולים בצמרת" - התקליט חיפה 1977

תקליט "שובי דובי" - 1977

תקליט "ברבא אבא" - פונוקול 1978

תקליט "זלמן יש לו מכנסיים" - הד ארצי 1979

תקליט "ד"ר דוליטל" - הד ארצי 1980

תקליט "בנלוקחבת" - הד ארצי 1982

"תקליט "חברי הדרקון אליוט

"תקליט "הרפתקאות ברנארד וביאנקה

"תקליט "שירי חג לילדים

"תקליט "29 שירים עליזים לילדים

תקליטורים Children's CDs:

תקליטור חדש] "זלמן יש לו מכנסיים" - הד ארצי 2009]

2006 NMC - תקליטור "מיטב שירי הילדים"

תקליטור "החיפושיות" - התקליט 2006

תקליטור "שובי דובי" - סקאיטון 2005

תקליטור "הטיול לארץ התוים" - ויזארט 2004

תקליטור "ברל'ה צא החוצה" - התקליט 1996

תקליטונים Records:

"תקליט "ספינת השלום

See also
The Mamas & the Papas

References

External links
 The group's website

Israeli folk music groups
Musical groups established in 1971
Israeli pop music groups